The Mongolia women's national 3x3 team is a national basketball team of Mongolia, administered by the Mongolian Basketball Association. It represents the country in international 3x3 (3 against 3) women's basketball competitions.

Tournament record

Asian Games

Summer Olympics

World Cup

FIBA U 23 World Cup

Asia Cup

World Beach Games

See also
Mongolia men's national 3x3 team
Mongolia women's national basketball team

References

Mongolia women's national basketball team
Women's national 3x3 basketball teams